Frank Barton (31 October 1900 – 16 November 1983) was  a former Australian rules footballer who played with Footscray in the Victorian Football League (VFL).

Notes

External links 
		

1900 births
1983 deaths
Australian rules footballers from Victoria (Australia)
Western Bulldogs players
Yarraville Football Club players